Dalystown is a village in Carrick, County Westmeath, Ireland. It is located in the south of the county on the N52 road, to the north of Tyrrellspass and Rochfortbridge.

The village contains a National school, and a public house. Lough Ennell is to the north of the village.

Dalystown House 
A two story house dating back to c1820 stands in the village. The building features a natural slate roof, rendered chimney stacks and a number of stone outbuildings.

See also 

 List of towns and villages in Ireland
 Carrick, County Westmeath

References 

Towns and villages in County Westmeath